Neil Starling (born  in Kingston upon Thames, England) is a rugby union player currently playing for London Welsh. His previous clubs include Northampton Saints and Rotherham Titans in the Guinness Premiership. He plays as a centre.

References

External links
London Welsh profile
Northampton Saints profile

1982 births
Living people
English rugby union players
Northampton Saints players
Rotherham Titans players
Rugby union players from Kingston upon Thames